Ehsan Lashgari (born August 30, 1985 in Qazvin) is an Iranian wrestler.  He won the bronze medal in the 84 kg Freestyle competition at the 2012 Summer Olympics.

References

 Profile at FILA Wrestling Database

Living people
Iranian male sport wrestlers
Olympic wrestlers of Iran
Olympic bronze medalists for Iran
Wrestlers at the 2012 Summer Olympics
Olympic medalists in wrestling
People from Qazvin
Medalists at the 2012 Summer Olympics
World Wrestling Championships medalists
Year of birth missing (living people)
Asian Wrestling Championships medalists
20th-century Iranian people
21st-century Iranian people